TDU may stand for:

 Test Drive Unlimited, a 2006 racing computer game
 Tour Down Under, a cycling competition in Australia
 Teamsters for a Democratic Union, a movement to reform the Teamsters labor union
 Trash disposal unit, a life support system on submarines
 Institute of Trans-Disciplinary Health Sciences and Technology, a private university in India